Henry Eugene McCann (June 13, 1876 – April 26, 1943) was an American professional baseball player and scout. He played in Major League Baseball as a right-handed pitcher. Born in Baltimore, Maryland, he pitched in nine games for the Brooklyn Superbas during the 1901 and 1902 baseball seasons. He later became a scout for the New York Yankees under manager Joe McCarthy. He died at age 66 in New York City.

External links

1876 births
1943 deaths
Major League Baseball pitchers
Brooklyn Superbas players
Baseball players from Baltimore
Minor league baseball managers
Lincoln Treeplanters players
Petersburg Farmers players
Hampton Clamdiggers players
Hanover Tigers players
Hamilton Blackbirds players
Hamilton Hams players
Chatham Reds players
Detroit Tigers (Western League) players
Hartford Indians players
Wooden Nutmegs players
Minneapolis Millers (baseball) players
Jersey City Skeeters players
New York Yankees scouts